Humboldt-Watrous is a provincial electoral district for the Legislative Assembly of Saskatchewan, Canada. It was created from parts of Humboldt and Arm River-Watrous and was first contested in the 2016 election.

Members of the Legislative Assembly

This riding has elected the following Members of the Legislative Assembly:

Election results

References

Humboldt, Saskatchewan
Saskatchewan provincial electoral districts